An Inspector Calls is a 1945 play by J. B. Priestley.

An Inspector Calls may also refer to:
 An Inspector Calls (1954 film), directed by Guy Hamilton
 An Inspector Calls (TV series), directed by Michael Simpson
 An Inspector Calls (2015 Hong Kong film), Hong Kong black comedy film directed by Raymond Wong and Herman Yau
 An Inspector Calls (2015 TV film), directed by Aisling Walsh

See also